Belén Iglesias Marcos (born 6 July 1996) is a field hockey player from Spain, who plays as a forward.

Personal life
Belén Iglesias was born and raised in Madrid, Spain. She is the younger sister of Álvaro Iglesias, who plays for the Spanish men's national team.

Career

Club hockey
Iglesias plays hockey for Großflottbeker THGC. Previously she represented Club de Campo in the División de Honor in Spain, and UHC Hamburg in the German Bundesliga.

National teams

Under–21
In 2016, Iglesias was a member of the Spanish Under–21 team at the FIH Junior World Cup in Santiago.

She followed this up with an appearance at the 2017 EuroHockey Junior Championship in Valencia where the team finished fifth.

Red Sticks
Iglesias made her debut for the Spanish national team, the 'Red Sticks', in 2017.

In 2019, she won her first medal with the national team, taking home bronze at the EuroHockey Championships in Antwerp.

References

External links
 
 
 
 

1996 births
Living people
Female field hockey forwards
Spanish female field hockey players
Field hockey players at the 2020 Summer Olympics
Olympic field hockey players of Spain
20th-century Spanish women
21st-century Spanish women